Hank Live is a live album by American musician Hank Williams Jr. It was released by Warner Bros. Records in January 1987. The album reached No. 1 on the Top Country Albums chart and has been certified Platinum by the RIAA.

Track listing
"Intro/Hank Williams, Jr." (Dickey Betts, Bonnie Bramlett) - 0:43
"My Name Is Bocephus" (Hank Williams Jr.) - 3:49
"Workin' for MCA" (Ed King, Ronnie Van Zant) - 1:20
"I Really Like Girls" (George Thorogood) - 3:42
"If You Don't Like Hank Williams" (Kris Kristofferson) - 2:31
"Sweet Home Alabama" (King, Gary Rossington, Van Zant) - 2:07
"Spoken Intro/La Grange" (Dusty Hill, Frank Beard, Billy Gibbons) - 8:42
"Medley: Trouble in Mind/Short Haired Woman" (Richard M. Jones) - 5:34
"The Conversation" (Waylon Jennings, Ritchie Albright, Hank Williams Jr.) - 1:49
"Man of Steel" (Hank Williams Jr.) - 1:05
"I'm for Love" (Hank Williams Jr.) - 3:14
"If Heaven Ain't a Lot Like Dixie" (Billy Maddox, David Moore) - 1:09
"All My Rowdy Friends (Have Settled Down)" (Hank Williams Jr.) - 2:21
"House of the Rising Sun" (Traditional) - 3:21
"The Ride" (J. B. Detterline Jr., Gary Gentry) - 2:41
"A Country Boy Can Survive" (Hank Williams Jr.) - 4:53
"Medley: Family Tradition/Hey Good Lookin'" (Hank Williams Jr.. Hank Williams) - 3:02

Personnel
Ray Barrickman - bass guitar
Vernon Derrick - fiddle
Billy Earheart - keyboards, piano
Merle Kilgore - acoustic guitar, background vocals
"Cowboy" Eddie Long - pedal steel guitar
Bill Marshall - drums
Jerry McKinney - saxophone
Lamar Morris - electric guitar
Wayne Turner - electric guitar
Hank Williams Jr. - acoustic guitar, electric guitar, lead vocals

Chart performance

References

Albums produced by Barry Beckett
1987 live albums
Hank Williams Jr. live albums
Warner Records live albums
Albums produced by Jim Ed Norman